Gornja Lastva is a small settlement in the municipality of Tivat, Montenegro. It is located east of Tivat.

Demographics
According to the 2011 census, it had an unknown population.

References

Populated places in Tivat Municipality